Ilex guayusa ( or ) is a species of tree of the holly genus, native to the Amazon Rainforest. One of four known caffeinated holly trees, the leaves of the guayusa tree are harvested fresh and brewed like a tea for their stimulative effects.

Description
The flowers are small and white, arranged in thyrses. The fruit is spherical and red,  in diameter.

Distribution and habitat 
However, it has also been collected in Bolivia in 1939. It is present in evergreen or deciduous premontane forests, especially ones dominated by Dictyocaryum palms. Guayusa has been collected only rarely in the wild by botanists and is known almost exclusively as a cultivated plant (especially in the Ecuadorian provinces of Napo and Pastaza).

Ecology 
This species is found wild and cultivated in sandy-loamy soils of pH 4.34–5.01 with low cation-exchange capacity and high metal content. The vegetation type preferred is lowland and premontane, neotropical jungle where conditions of soil, precipitation and humidity are appropriate for its development. Despite being a monoecious species and prone to floral polygamy, Ilex guayusa appears to yield little fertile material, so it relies mostly on asexual reproduction (basal shoots, sprouts and suckers). In its initial growth stages, Ilex guayusa behaves as an understory species, becoming a shrub with spreading branches when it receives higher amounts of light, eventually becoming a tree.

History 
The earliest evidence of human utilization of this species is a 1,500-year-old bundle of guayusa leaves found in a medicine man's tomb in the Bolivian Andes, far beyond the natural range of the plant.

Father Juan Lorenzo Lucero reported in 1683 the daily consumption of guayusa in infusions by the Jivaroan peoples.

In the 18th century, several missionaries in Colombia, Ecuador and Peru wrote about the uses of the plant, and some of them also consumed the infusion citing digestive and stimulant properties.

The Jesuits knew about the medicinal uses of the plant and traded it actively.

A grove found in 1857 by Richard Spruce near the town of Baños, Ecuador was supposedly cultivated since precolumbian times.

Vernacular names 
Spanish: guayusa

Kichwa: waisa

Shuar: wayus, wais

Uses
Leaves of Ilex guayusa are used to make an infusion, especially in Ecuador, Peru and Colombia. After harvest, leaves are dried, which allows flavor to develop.

Jivaroan peoples in Ecuador and Peru also prepare a drink from the leaves to be drunk in large amounts during pre-dawn ceremonies that involve the vomiting of the excess drink to wash out the stomach and small intestine and avoid absorbing too much caffeine. A ritual use by the Quechua people involves drinking guayusa infusion to have foretelling dreams for successful hunting expeditions.

Guayusa is also consumed at parties and local festivals as a social drink, especially by the Kichua people in Ecuador.

In the three aforementioned countries, guayusa is used in the preparation of artisanal alcoholic drinks.

Chemical composition
Guayusa leaves contain caffeine (1.73–3.48 %), theobromine and other dimethylxanthines (among them paraxanthine and theophylline). Guayusa leaves also contain L-theanine, gallic acid, guanidine, isobutyric acid, nicotinic acid, ascorbic acid, riboflavin, choline, pyridoxine, triterpenes, chlorogenic acid and sugars among other compounds.

See also
 Yerba mate (Ilex paraguariensis) - South American caffeinated holly species used to make Mate.
 Yaupon holly (Ilex vomitoria) - southeastern North American caffeinated holly species used to make the Black Drink.
 Kuding (Ilex kudingcha) - Asian holly species used with Ligustrum robustum for Chinese kǔdīng chá'' tea.

References

guayusa
Flora of the Amazon
Ecuadorian cuisine
Herbal and fungal stimulants
Herbal tea
Medicinal plants of South America
Oneirogens
Trees of Ecuador
Trees of Peru
Trees of Colombia
Guayusa